One for the Money is an album by The Whispers. Released in 1976, this album charted at number 40 on the Billboard Soul Albums chart. It was their debut album on Don Cornelius's and Dick Griffey's Soul Train Records.

Track listing

Personnel
Norman Harris, T.J. Tindell, Bobby Eli – guitars
Ronald Baker, Michael Foreman – bass
Earl Young – drums
Ron Kersey – keyboards
Larry Washington – congas
Brian Evans – acoustic guitar
Bruce Gray – Rhodes piano

Charts

Singles

References

External links
 

1976 albums
The Whispers albums
Albums produced by Norman Harris
Albums recorded at Sigma Sound Studios